Anastasiya Shepilenko (born 9 October 2000) is a World Cup alpine ski racer from Ukraine.

Career
Shepilenko started her international career in 2017 when she represented Ukraine at the 2017 European Youth Olympic Winter Festival in Turkish Erzerum (she was 25th in slalom and 36th in giant slalom). After that she competed at four World Junior  Championships achieving following best results by discipline: 23rd in alpine combined in 2020, 28th in Super-G in 2020, 30th in slalom in 2021, 35th in downhill in 2020, 51st in giant slalom in 2020.

Shepilenko debuted at the World Cup on 23 January 2022, when she finished 34th in Super-G in Cortina d'Ampezzo.

In 2022, Anastasiya Shepilenko was nominated for her first Winter Games in Beijing. Her best finish at the Games was 37th in Super-G.

As of January 2022, Shepilenko participated at two World Championships: in 2019 and 2021. After the 2021 competitions, her best performance was 35th in slalom in 2021.

Career results

Olympics

World Championships

World Cup

Results per discipline

Standings through 24 January 2023.

European Cup

Results per discipline

Standings through 24 January 2023.

Personal life
Her mother, Yuliya Shepilenko, is a former alpine skier who represented Ukraine at the 1998 Winter Olympics. Her sister Kateryna, who is two years younger, is also an alpine skier and participated at the World Championships.

Shepilenko studied at Lviv State School of Physical Culture. She completed a bachelor's programm in physical education and sports at the Lviv State University of Physical Culture.

References

External links
 
 

Ukrainian female alpine skiers
2000 births
Living people
Alpine skiers at the 2022 Winter Olympics
Olympic alpine skiers of Ukraine
Competitors at the 2023 Winter World University Games
21st-century Ukrainian women